The New Hampshire Public Utilities Commission (NHPUC) is a government agency of the U.S. state of New Hampshire. Headquartered in Concord, it is a public utilities commission with jurisdiction over electric, natural gas, water and sewer utilities as defined by New Hampshire statute for matters such as rates, quality of service, finance, accounting, and safety.

The NHPUC is made up of three commissioners, appointed by the Governor of New Hampshire and confirmed by the Governor's Council. The commissioners serve staggered six-year terms. Administration of the commission is overseen by an executive director.

References

External links

Public Utilities Commission
New Hampshire
Government agencies established in 1911
1911 establishments in New Hampshire